Latin rite may refer to
 the Latin Church (generally capitalized), the largest Catholic sui iuris church
 one of the Latin liturgical rites
 the Roman Rite, the principal Latin liturgical rite
 the Liturgical use of Latin, for celebration of Christian liturgy in the Latin language
 the Tridentine Mass, often referred to as the "Traditional Latin Mass"
 Western Rite Orthodoxy, Latin liturgical practices as used by Eastern Orthodox Christians